John Antony Townley (6 November 1912 – 27 September 1984), known professionally as Toke Townley, was an English actor.

Biography
Townley was born on 6 November 1912 at Great Dunmow, Essex; his father was a vicar. His first name, "John", was changed to "Toke" shortly after his birth. After he left school he worked as a clerk in a factory, acting in his spare time. He did not become a professional actor until his early 30s, first appearing at Birmingham Repertory Theatre. He appeared in many BBC television programmes during the early pioneering days at Alexandra Palace.

Between 1951 and 1970, in the heyday of the British studios, Townley appeared in almost thirty films, including Lady Godiva Rides Again, Doctor at Sea, The Quatermass Xperiment, The Admirable Crichton, Carry on Admiral, Doctor in Distress and Scars of Dracula.

He went on to appear in many film and television roles over the years, including The Avengers. He was also an accomplished flautist and played the instrument on screen.
 
Many of his roles were country bumpkins, so it was an appropriate move when Townley joined Emmerdale (known from 1972 until 1989 as Emmerdale Farm) as Annie Sugden's father, Sam Pearson, complete with cloth cap and collarless shirt, when the serial began in 1972. Although Sam was said to have been born in the 1890s, Townley was actually just seven years older than Sheila Mercier, who played his daughter. He appeared in over 800 episodes of Emmerdale Farm.  Loved and admired by the rest of the cast of the rural soap opera, Townley was said to be a private person, living alone at a Leeds hotel, near where the programme was filmed. He died of a heart attack whilst still in the soap so his character was killed off.

Partial filmography

 Lady Godiva Rides Again (1951) - Lucille's husband
 Treasure Hunt (1952) - William Burke
 Time Gentlemen, Please! (1952) - Potman
 Meet Me Tonight (1952) - Stage Manager - Red Peppers
 My Wife's Lodger (1952) - Soldier
 Cosh Boy (1953) - Mr. 'Smith' (uncredited)
 Turn the Key Softly (1953) - Prison Guard (uncredited)
 The Broken Horseshoe (1953) - Fred Barker, Hall Porter
 Innocents in Paris (1953) - Airport Porter (uncredited)
 Meet Mr. Lucifer (1953) - Trumpet Player
 The Million Pound Note (1954) - Revivalist (uncredited)
 Fast and Loose (1954) - Alfred
 The Runaway Bus (1954) - Henry Waterman
 Bang! You're Dead (1954) - Jimmy Knuckle
 The Men of Sherwood Forest (1954) - Father David
 Doctor at Sea  (1955) - Jenkins
 John and Julie (1955) - Booking Clerk
 The Quatermass Xperiment (1955) - The Chemist (uncredited)
 The Blue Peter (1955) - Pub Barman (uncredited)
 Now and Forever (1956) - Garage Hand (uncredited)
 Three Men in a Boat (1956) - Meek Man (Maze)
 Carry on Admiral (1957) - Steward
 The Admirable Crichton (1957) - Lovegrove
 Barnacle Bill (1957) - Timmins
 Innocent Sinners (1958) - Bates (uncredited)
 Law and Disorder (1958) - Sidney Rumpthorne
 A Cry from the Streets (1958) - Mr. Daniels
 Look Back in Anger (1959) - Spectacled Man
 Libel (1959) - Associate 
 The World of Suzie Wong (1960) - Waiter (uncredited)
 The Missing Note (1961) - Mr. Parker
 The Avengers (1961, TV series)
 A Chance of Thunder (1961, TV series) -  Frank White
 H.M.S. Defiant (1962) - Silly Billy
 The Fast Lady (1962) - Angry Motorist
 Doctor in Distress (1963) - Clerk of Works (uncredited)
 The Chalk Garden (1963) - Shop Clerk
 Scars of Dracula (1970) - Elderly Waggoner

References

External links
 

1912 births
1984 deaths
English male film actors
English male television actors
People from Great Dunmow
20th-century English male actors